Hannah Retter (1839–1940) was a New Zealand centenarian who was born two months before the signing of the Treaty of Waitangi. Of Māori descent, her mother was from the Ngāti Pariri hapū of the Muaupoko iwi. She was born in Sydney, Australia in late 1839.

References

1839 births
1940 deaths
People from Sydney
New Zealand Māori midwives
New Zealand midwives
Muaūpoko people
Australian emigrants to New Zealand